William Patchett (died 17 June 1843) was among the Europeans who died in the Wairau Affray.

Patchett died in Wairau, New Zealand.

References 
 

1843 deaths
Year of birth unknown